The 2015–16 Lega Basket Serie A, known for sponsorship reasons as the Serie A BEKO, was the 94th season of the Lega Basket Serie A, the highest professional basketball league in Italy.

The regular season started on 4 October 2015 and finished on 4 May 2015, with the playoffs starting on 7 May (dependent on an Italian club qualifying for the 2016 Euroleague Final Four) and finished between 13 and 16 June depending on results.

Banco di Sardegna Sassari was the defending champion.

EA7 Emporio Armani Milano won their 27th title by beating Grissin Bon Reggio Emilia in game 6 of the finals.

Teams

Number of teams by region

Venues and locations

 Pasta Reggia Caserta took the place of Acea Roma which has renounced to the 2015–16 Serie A.

Personnel and sponsorship

Managerial Changes

Changes from 2014–15
The season saw historic public broadcaster RAI (one match every week) joined by Sky Italia (two matches every week) in broadcasting the league's games for television, after an agreement with Lega Basket covering the 2015–16 and 2016–17 seasons.

Rules
The season consists of a home-and-away schedule of 30 games, followed by an eight-team playoff round. The Quarterfinals are best-of-five, while the semifinals and finals series are best-of-seven. The last placed club is relegated, and is replaced by the winner of the playoffs of the second-level Serie A2 Basket.

Each team is allowed either five or seven foreign players under two formulas:
5 foreigners from countries outside the European Union
3 foreigners from countries outside the E.U., 4 foreigners from E.U. countries (also including those from countries signatory of the Cotonou Agreement) 
In early September 2015, nine squads had chosen the 5+5 formula and seven the 3+4+5.

Regular season

Standings

Calendar

Statistical leaders
As of 04 May 2016.

Points

Assists

Steals

Rebounds

Blocks

Valuation

Playoffs

The Serie A playoffs quarterfinals are best-of-five, while the semifinals and finals series are best-of-seven.

Serie A clubs in European competitions

Supercup

The 2015 Italian Supercup was the 21st edition of the super cup tournament in Italian basketball. 
It opened the season on 26 and 27 September 2015. Qualified for the tournament were league winners and cup winners Banco di Sardegna Sassari, cup finalists EA7 Emporio Armani Milano and league finalist Grissin Bon Reggio Emilia and Umana Reyer Venezia. These four teams competed for the title in Turin's PalaRuffini. 
Grissin Bon Reggio Emilia went on to win its first Supercoppa ever beating EA7 Emporio Armani Milano.

All Star Game
The league's All Star Game was contested on 10 January 2016 at PalaTrento in the city of Trento.
The two teams were Dolomiti Energia Team and Cavit Team, for sponsorship reasons. The Cavit Team's head coach was the American Dan Peterson.
The event was organized in a match between the two All Star teams, the three-point contest and the slam dunk contest. All teams' players had been voted by the Serie A supporters.
Cavit Team won the game 154–148. Alex Kirk was named MVP of the 2016 Serie A All Star Game.

Cup

The 48th edition of the Italian Cup, knows as the Beko Final Eight for sponsorship reasons, was contested between 19 and 21 February 2016 in Milan at the Mediolanum Forum. Eight teams qualified for the Final Eight were the best ranked teams at the end of the first stage of the 2015–16 Serie A. 
EA7 Emporio Armani Milano won their 5th Italian Cup since over 20 years.

Awards
As of 04 May 2016.

Most Valuable Player

Best Player Under 22

Best Coach

Best Executive

Finals MVP

Source:

Notes

References

External links
 Lega Basket website  Retrieved 2 September 2015

   
Lega Basket Serie A seasons
1
Italy